Anjanette Kirkland (born February 24, 1974) is an American hurdler.

In 2001, she won gold medals at the World Indoor Championships and the World Championships, the latter in a career best time of 12.42 seconds. She also competed at the World Championships in 1997 and 2003 without reaching the final.

References
 

1974 births
Living people
American female hurdlers
Track and field athletes from Louisiana
Texas A&M Aggies women's track and field athletes
People from Pineville, Louisiana
World Athletics Championships athletes for the United States
World Athletics Championships medalists
Goodwill Games medalists in athletics
World Athletics Indoor Championships winners
World Athletics Championships winners
Competitors at the 2001 Goodwill Games
20th-century American women
21st-century American women
Sportspeople from Rapides Parish, Louisiana